Pseudonephthea is a genus of corals containing the only species Pseudonephthea liltvedi, or the stalked cauliflower soft coral. It is a cnidarian that is endemic to the coast of South Africa.

Description 
Colonies, which may consist of several stems, rise from a single base. They form erect, cauliflower-like forms with the polyps closely clustered at the ends of short, narrow branches. The bundles of polyps are supported by cup-like structures and do not have. The colonies are variable in colour and usually range from white ir pale beige to pink and orange. 

They may look similar to species belonging to Eunephthya. Eunephthya species, however, have branches of equal width (opposed to a range of ranch thicknesses found in Pseudonephthea liltvedi).

Distribution and habitat 
This species is endemic to the Benguela region off the west coast of South Africa. They lack zooxanthellae, which allows them to grow in deeper regions as they do not rely on the associated photosynthesis for sustenance.

Taxonomy 
This species was considered to belong to the genus Gersemia until 2022. Following a phylogenomic study it was moved into its own genus and its own family to reflect its unique phylogeny and morphology. The family and genus name pay tribute to its former misclassification to two different genera in the family Nephtheidae.

References 

Animals described in 1988
Fauna of South Africa
Octocorallia
Monotypic cnidarian genera